Rhyssella nitida is a species of ichneumon wasp in the family Ichneumonidae.

References

Further reading

External links

 

Parasitic wasps
Insects described in 1864